A cooper is a person trained to make wooden casks, barrels, vats, buckets, tubs, troughs and other similar containers from timber staves that were usually heated or steamed to make them pliable.

Journeymen coopers also traditionally made wooden implements, such as rakes and wooden-bladed shovels. In addition to wood, other materials, such as iron, were used in the manufacturing process. The trade is the origin of the surname Cooper.

Etymology
The word "cooper" is derived from Middle Dutch or Middle Low German kūper 'cooper' from kūpe 'cask', in turn from Latin cupa 'tun, barrel'. Everything a cooper produces is referred to collectively as cooperage. A cask is any piece of cooperage containing a bouge, bilge, or bulge in the middle of the container. A barrel is a type of cask, so the terms "barrel-maker" and "barrel-making" refer to just one aspect of a cooper's work. The facility in which casks are made is also referred to as a cooperage.

As a name
In much the same way as the trade or vocation of smithing produced the common English surname Smith and the German name Schmidt (see occupational surname), the cooper trade is also the origin of the English name Cooper.

It is also the origin of the French Tonnelier and Tonnellier; Greek Varelas; Danish Bødker; German Binder, Fassbender or Fassbinder (literally 'cask-binder'), Böttcher ('tub-maker'), Scheffler, and Kübler; Dutch Kuiper and Cuypers; Lithuanian Kubilius; Latvian Mucenieks; Armenian Տակառագործյան; Hungarian Kádár, Bognár and Bodnár; Polish Bednarz, Bednarski, and Bednarczyk; Czech Bednář; Romanian Dogaru and Butnaru; Ukrainian Bondar, Bodnaruk, and Bodnarchuk, and Bondarenko; Russian and Ukrainian Bondarev and Bocharov; Yiddish Bodner; Portuguese Tanoeiro and Toneleiro; Spanish Cubero, Tonelero, and (via Greek) Varela; Bulgarian Bachvarov; Macedonian Bacvarovski; Croatian Bačvar; Slovene Pintar (from German ) and Italian Bottai (from ).

History
Traditionally, a cooper is someone who makes wooden, staved vessels, held together with wooden or metal hoops and possessing flat ends or heads. Examples of a cooper's work include casks, barrels, buckets, tubs, butter churns, vats, hogsheads, firkins, tierces, rundlets, puncheons, pipes, tuns, butts, troughs, pins and breakers. Traditionally, a hooper was the man who fitted the wooden or metal hoops around the barrels or buckets that the cooper had made, essentially an assistant to the cooper. The English name Hooper is derived from that profession. With time, many coopers took on the role of the hooper themselves.

Antiquity

An Egyptian wall-painting in the tomb of Hesy-Ra, dating to 2600 BC, shows a wooden tub made of staves, bound together with wooden hoops, and used to measure. Another Egyptian tomb painting dating to 1900 BC shows a cooper and tubs made of staves in use at the grape harvest. Palm-wood casks were reported in use in ancient Babylon. In Europe, buckets and casks dating to 200 BC have been found preserved in the mud of lake villages. A lake village near Glastonbury dating to the late Iron Age has yielded one complete tub and a number of wooden staves.

The Roman historian Pliny the Elder reports that cooperage in Europe originated with the Gauls in Alpine villages where they stored their beverages in wooden casks bound with hoops. Pliny identified three types of coopers: ordinary coopers, wine coopers and coopers who made large casks. Large casks contained more and longer staves and were correspondingly more difficult to assemble. Roman coopers tended to be independent tradesmen, passing their skills on to their sons. The Greek geographer Strabo records wooden pithoi (casks) were lined with pitch to stop leakage and preserve the wine. Barrels were sometimes used for military purposes. Julius Caesar used catapults to hurl barrels of burning tar into towns under siege to start fires. Empty barrels were sometimes used to make pontoon bridges to cross rivers.

Empty casks were used to line the walls of shallow wells from at least Roman times. Such casks were found in 1897 during archaeological excavation of Roman Silchester in Britain. They were made of Pyrenean silver fir and the staves were one and a half inches thick and featured grooves where the heads fitted. They had Roman numerals scratched on the surface of each stave to help with reassembly.

Middle Ages to today

In Anglo-Saxon Britain wooden barrels were used to store ale, butter, honey and mead. Drinking vessels were also made from small staves of oak, yew or pine. These items required considerable craftsmanship to hold liquids and might be bound with finely worked precious metals. They were highly valued items and were sometimes buried with the dead as grave goods. Churns, buckets and tubs made from staves have been excavated from peat bogs and lake villages in Europe. A large keg and a bucket were found in the Viking Gokstad ship excavated near Oslo Fiord in 1880.

There were four divisions in the cooper's craft. The "dry" or "slack" cooper made containers that would be used to ship dry goods such as cereals, nails, tobacco, fruits, and vegetables. The "dry-tight" cooper made casks designed to keep dry goods in and moisture out. Gunpowder and flour casks are examples of a dry-tight cooper's work. The "white" cooper made straight-staved containers like washtubs, buckets, and butter churns, which would hold water and other liquids but did not allow shipping of the liquids. Usually there was no bending of wood involved in white cooperage. The "wet" or "tight" cooper made casks for long-term storage and transportation of liquids that could even be under pressure, as with beer. The "general" cooper worked on ships, on the docks, in breweries, wineries and distilleries, and in warehouses, and was responsible for cargo while in storage or transit.

Ships, in the age of sail, provided much work for coopers. They made water and provision casks, the contents of which sustained crew and passengers on long voyages. They also made barrels to contain high-value commodities, such as wine and sugar. The proper stowage of casks on ships about to sail was an important stevedoring skill. Casks of various sizes were used to accommodate the sloping walls of the hull and make maximum use of limited space. Casks also had to be tightly packed, to ensure they did not move during the voyage and endanger the ship, crew and cask contents. Whaling ships in particular, featuring long voyages and large crews, needed many casks – for salted meat, other provisions and water – and to store the whale oil. Sperm whale oil was a particularly difficult substance to contain, due to its highly viscous nature, and oil coopers were perhaps the most skilled tradesmen in pre-industrial cooperage. Whaling ships usually carried a cooper on board, to assemble shooks (disassembled barrels) and maintain casks.

Coopers in Britain started to organise as early as 1298. The Worshipful Company of Coopers is one of the oldest Livery Companies in London. It still survives today although it is now largely a charitable organisation.

Many coopers worked for breweries. They made the large wooden vats in which beer was brewed. They also made the wooden kegs in which the beer was shipped to liquor retailers. Beer kegs had to be particularly strong in order to contain the pressure of the fermenting liquid, and the rough handling they received when transported, sometime over long distances, to pubs where they were rolled into tap-rooms or were lowered into cellars.

Prior to the mid-20th century, the cooper's trade flourished in the United States; a dedicated trade journal was published, the National Cooper's Journal, with advertisements from firms that supplied everything from barrel staves to purpose-built machinery.
Plastics, stainless steel, pallets, and corrugated cardboard replaced most wooden containers during the last half of the 20th century, and largely made the cooperage trade obsolete.

In the 21st century, coopers mostly operate barrel-making machinery and assemble casks for the wine and spirits industry. Traditionally, the staves were heated to make them easier to bend. This is still done, but now because the slightly toasted interior of the staves imparts a certain flavour over time to the wine or spirit contents that is much admired by experts. In England, the trade of master cooper is dwindling; but in Scotland there are several active cooperages that provide barrels to the whisky industry. It is thought that the last remaining master cooper in England works for Theakston Brewery in Masham.

See also
Coopers' Dance

References

Bibliography

 National cooper's journal, vol. 38

Further reading
 Society for the Preservation of Beers from the Wood
 CBC article on England's last master cooper

External links
 Japanese cooper from Kyoto
 

Artisans
Woodworkers
Historical economic occupations
Marine occupations